Finnegan's Ball is a 1927 American silent comedy film directed by James P. Hogan and starring Blanche Mehaffey, Mack Swain and Cullen Landis. It is based on an 1894 Broadway play of the same title.

Synopsis
The Finnegan family emigrate from Ireland to the United States, but get into a dispute with their neighbors the Flannigans. The Finnegans mistakenly believe they have inherited a large fortune and become very snobbish, but all is resolved by a marriage between the two families.

Cast
 Blanche Mehaffey as Molly Finnegan
 Mack Swain as 	Patrick Flannigan
 Cullen Landis as 	Flannigan Jr
 Aggie Herring as 	Maggie Finnegan
 Charles McHugh as Danny Finnegan Sr
 Westcott Clarke as Lawyer O'Connell 
 Kewpie Morgan as 	Judge Morgan
 Mimi Finnegan as 	Danny Finnegan Jr
 Harry Bowen as Cop

References

Bibliography
 Connelly, Robert B. The Silents: Silent Feature Films, 1910-36, Volume 40, Issue 2. December Press, 1998.
 Munden, Kenneth White. The American Film Institute Catalog of Motion Pictures Produced in the United States, Part 1. University of California Press, 1997.

External links
 

1927 films
1927 comedy films
1920s English-language films
American silent feature films
Silent American comedy films
American black-and-white films
Films directed by James Patrick Hogan
American films based on plays
1920s American films